A tail is the section at the rear end of an animal's body, a distinct, flexible appendage to the torso. 

Tail or tails may also refer to:

Science and technology
 Tails (operating system) or The Amnesic Incognito Live System, a Linux distribution designed for anonymity and privacy
 Tail (Unix), a Unix program used to display the last few lines of a file
 Tail, one of the extreme ends of a probability density function
 Terminal amine isotopic labeling of substrates
Poly-A tail, part of a mature mRNA

Entertainment
 Tails (album), an album by Lisa Loeb
 Tails (Sonic the Hedgehog), a character in the Sonic the Hedgehog video games and comics
 Tail, a character in the Kaiketsu Zorori movie

Other uses
 Tails, the reverse side of a coin
 Tailcoat or its rear section, a type of coat/suit used for evening dress
 Tail, the final batsmen in the batting order for cricket
 Fee tail or tail, an obsolescent term in common law
 Jabot (window), a kind of soft window treatment

See also
 Aircraft tail, the empennage of an aircraft
 Comet tail, a visible part of a comet
 Tail recursion, a type of recursion in computer programming
 Tail rotor, a small vertical propeller mounted at the rear of a helicopter
 Tailing (disambiguation)